Blue Giant is an American rock band from Portland, Oregon. An eclectic mix of country, indie rock, and psychedelic styles, Blue Giant have been called a Portland supergroup. The band was originally composed of the songwriters and musicians from Viva Voce, Kevin Leigh Robinson and Anita Lee Elliott, Chris Funk of The Decemberists, Evan Railton of Swords, and Seth Lorinczi of The Golden Bears, Circus Lupus & The Quails. Musically, Blue Giant could be characterized as rural psychedelic rock, with one music critic calling them a perfect country rock band.

History
After touring extensively in 2007 with The Shins and Jimmy Eat World, Kevin and Anita of Viva Voce took a brief hiatus. Tiring of the confines of a two-piece band, they began writing songs they considered for another band. Evan Railton of Swords was asked to play drums. Seth Lorinczi of The Golden Bears & Circus Lupus was invited to play bass. Last to join on pedal steel was Chris Funk of The Decemberists, who, upon hearing the band's early demos, demanded to join the band. Infused with their own respective indie-rock, punk and DIY backgrounds, the Blue Giant songs reflect a greater part of the Robinson's Southern heritage.

The band name is a reference to a blue giant star, a transitory phase in the life cycle of a star, and one of the brightest types of stars in the universe.

Blue Giant played their first show in June 2008 headlining the Wonder Ballroom in Portland. The band gave each audience member a free download of their first recording.

Collaborations
Blue Giant has recorded and performed with Corin Tucker of Sleater Kinney. Tucker's distinct voice is featured on a duet with Kevin Robinson on Blue Giant's debut EP.

Portland tour
Delving further in their collaborative spirit, Blue Giant went on a mini-tour of Portland in October 2008, each night bolstered by special guests such as Corin Tucker of Sleater Kinney, Sam Coomes of Quasi, Corrina Repp and Rachel Blumberg of Norfolk & Western, and M. Ward. The tour culminated in a collaboration with The Portland Cello Project, which saw Blue Giant accompanied by nine cellists.

Target Heart
Prior to release, Kevin was asked to talk about Blue Giant and the Target Heart EP in an eMusic Selects Q&A, on November 10, 2008. The 6 track CD EP was subsequently released by the imprint label Amore!Phonics. The 12" vinyl version of the album contains two additional tracks ("Wasn't Born To Follow" by The Byrds, and "Got To Be Free" by The Kinks) and was released through Jealous Butcher Records, the same label that printed the vinyl edition of Viva Voce's Rose City.

New tour, record deal, and lineup change
In February 2010, the band announced a nationwide tour and a recording deal with Vanguard Records, with plans to release a debut LP album on July 13, 2010. The announcement also stated that Funk and Lorinczi had relinquished their duties on pedal steel and bass, being replaced by Jesse Bates and Dave Depper, respectively.

Discography

References

External links
Official Blue Giant Website
Willamette Week Feature

2008 establishments in Oregon
Indie rock musical groups from Oregon
Musical groups from Portland, Oregon
Musical groups established in 2008